Post Mortem is a German crime drama television series which premiered on 18 January 2007 on RTL with a nine-Episode first Season. In April 2007 the series was renewed for a second season with another eight episodes, which will begin airing on 17 January 2008.

External links

2007 German television series debuts
2008 German television series endings
German crime television series
German drama television series
2000s German police procedural television series
German-language television shows
RTL (German TV channel) original programming